The 2016 SAFF Women's Championship  was the 4th edition of the SAFF Women's Championship, the biennial international women's football championship contested by the national teams of the South Asian Football Federation (SAFF). The tournament began in India from 26 December 2016 and went on until 4 January 2017. The country was awarded hosting rights in January 2016. This was the first time India had hosted the SAFF Women's Championship.

The defending champions coming into the tournament were India, who won the three previous tournaments. By the end of the tournament, India emerged as champions again, defeating Bangladesh in the final 3–1.

Participating teams
Apart from the hosts, India, six other South Asian teams participated in the tournament. On 3 November 2016 it was announced that Pakistan would not participate in the tournament.

Squads

Venue
The Kanchenjunga Stadium in Siliguri, West Bengal served as the host venue for the SAFF Women's Championship.

Group stage
The group stage draw for the tournament was held on 17 November 2016 at the South Asian Football Federation head office in Dhaka.

Group A

Group B

Knockout stage

Bracket

Semi-finals

Final

Goalscorers
 12 goals
  Sabitra Bhandari

 8 goals
  Sabina Khatun

 5 goals

  Sirat Jahan Shopna
  Fadhuwa Zahir

 3 goals

  Sasmita Malik
  Yumnam Kamala Devi

 2 goals

  Grace Dangmei
  Indumathi Kathiresan
  Aminath Shamila
  Erandi Liyanage

 1 goal

  Farkhunda Muhtaj
  Nargis Khatun
  Tanka Maya Ghalley
  Sanju Yadav
  Mariyam Rifa
  Sharmila Thapa
  Krishna Khatri
  Manjali Yonjan
  Sapana Lama
  Hira Kumari Bhujel
  Nirmala BK
  Maheshika Kumudini
  Praveena Perera

 1 own goal
  Rushani Gunawardena (playing against Nepal)

References

External links
 SAFF Women's Championship 2016.

 
2016
2016
2016 in Asian football
2017 in Asian football
2016–17 in Indian football
December 2016 sports events in India
January 2017 sports events in Asia
2016 in women's association football
2017 in women's association football
SAFF
SAFF